Wang Qiang (born April 14, 1987 in Hebei) is a male Chinese freestyle wrestler who will compete at the 2008 Summer Olympics.

His personal best was coming 1st at the 2007 National Intercity Games - 66 kg freestyle.

External links
profile

1987 births
Living people
Olympic wrestlers of China
Chinese male sport wrestlers
Sportspeople from Hebei
Wrestlers at the 2008 Summer Olympics
21st-century Chinese people